George J. Hill is a Canadian retired ice hockey center and coach who was an All-American for Michigan Tech.

Early life
Hill was born in Winnipeg. In 1960, he led the Brandon Wheat Kings to a first-place finish in the MJHL championship, winning the league scoring title, Rookie of the Year, and MVP. Brandon won the league tournament and advanced all the way to the Abbott Cup final, where they fell to the Edmonton Oil Kings 3–4. Hill's team had a near repeat performance the following year, this time losing to Edmonton, 1–4.

Career 
After two junior seasons, Hill was recruited to Michigan Tech by John MacInnes. He played on the freshman team in 1962 and watched the varsity club win the program's first National Championship. Hill led the team in scoring and was named both the WCHA Sophomore of the Year and an All-American. The Huskies were unable to overcome North Dakota in the Conference semifinal and did not compete in the national tournament. Hill was named team captain the following year. While he produced nearly identical numbers, the team was unable to defeat Michigan, losing their two-game series 8–9 on aggregate.

Hill left after his second season and pursued a professional career, playing in several senior and minor leagues over the next eight years. He ended his career in Austria, helping Wiener EV to a runner-up finish in 1972. He was inducted into the Michigan Tech Sports Hall of Fame in 1994.

Career statistics

Regular season and playoffs

Awards and honors

References

External links

1941 births
Living people
AHCA Division I men's ice hockey All-Americans
Brandon Wheat Kings players
Buffalo Bisons (AHL) players
Calgary Stampeders (ice hockey) players
Canadian ice hockey centres
Flin Flon Bombers players
Green Bay Bobcats players
Los Angeles Blades players
Michigan Tech Huskies men's ice hockey players
Omaha Knights (CHL) players
Tulsa Oilers (1964–1984) players
Ice hockey people from Winnipeg
Wiener EV players